The iliolumbar ligament is a strong ligament passing from the tip of the transverse process of the fifth lumbar vertebra to the posterior part of the inner lip of the iliac crest (upper margin of ilium).

Course 
It forms the thickened lower border of two of the layers of the thoracolumbar fascia.  Occasionally, a small ligamentous band stretches from the tip of the transverse process of the fourth vertebra down to the iliac crest behind the main ligament.  Usually, fibrous strands are found between this latter process and the iliac crest, but these are only considered a true ligament when dense enough.

It radiates as it passes laterally and is attached by two main bands to the pelvis.  The lower bands run to the base of the sacrum, blending with the anterior sacroiliac ligament; the upper is attached to the crest of the ilium immediately in front of the sacroiliac articulation, and is continuous above with the lumbodorsal fascia.  In front, it is in relation with the psoas major; behind, with the muscles occupying the vertebral groove; above, with the Quadratus lumborum.

Function 
The iliolumbar ligament strengthens the lumbosacral joint assisted by the lateral lumbosacral ligament, and, like all other vertebral joints, by the posterior and anterior longitudinal ligaments, the ligamenta flava, and the interspinous and supraspinous ligaments. It reduces the range of movement of the lumbosacral joint.

References

External links
 

Ligaments of the torso